Tim Keating may refer to:

 Timothy J. Keating (born 1948), retired U.S. Navy admiral
 Tim Keating (soldier), Lieutenant General and New Zealand Chief of Defence Force
 Tim Keating (American football), American college football coach